Oleksandr Sivkov (born in Poltava Oblast, Ukraine) is a Ukrainian sprint canoer. He is a silver medalists of the 2018 European Championships.

References

External links
Ukrainian Canoe Federation

Ukrainian male canoeists
Living people
Year of birth missing (living people)
Sportspeople from Poltava
21st-century Ukrainian people